Prior to its uniform adoption of proportional representation in 1999, the United Kingdom used first-past-the-post for the European elections in England, Scotland and Wales. The European Parliament constituencies used under that system were smaller than the later regional constituencies and only had one Member of the European Parliament each.

The constituency of Strathclyde East was one of them.

When it was created in Scotland in 1979, it consisted of the Westminster Parliament constituencies of Bothwell, Coatbridge and Airdrie, East Kilbride, Hamilton, Kilmarnock, Lanarkshire North, Motherwell and Wishaw, and Rutherglen. In 1984 until 1999 it consisted of the constituencies of Cumbernauld and Kilsyth, East Kilbride, Glasgow Rutherglen, Hamilton, Kilmarnock and Loudoun, Monklands East, Monklands West, Motherwell North, and Motherwell South.

Members of the European Parliament

Results

References

External links
 David Boothroyd's United Kingdom Election Results

European Parliament constituencies in Scotland (1979–1999)
1979 establishments in Scotland
1999 disestablishments in Scotland
Constituencies established in 1979
Constituencies disestablished in 1999